Nathaniel Whittock (26 January 1791 – 12 August 1860) was a Victorian topographical engraver, who published bird's-eye views, e.g. of York (1856), Oxford (1834), Melbourne, Australia (1854), Hull (1855), and London (1845, 1849, 1859).

Life
He was born to John and Sarah Whittock in the City of Westminster and was baptised on 6 March 1791 at St John's, Smith Square.  

By 1819 he was living in Oxford, where he ran the Oxford Drawing Academy in Oriel Street, teaching ladies on Tuesdays and Thursdays and gentlemen on Mondays, Wednesdays, and Fridays for two hours, charging a guinea every three months. He also had a Painting Room next to the Angel Hotel in the High Street. In 1823 he moved out of his house and shop in the High Street, and the premises were auctioned on 19 June that year. He moved to St Clement’s, a suburb of Oxford. The Oxford Baths were in St Clement’s, and on 6 May 1826 his book A Description of the Oxford Baths and School of Natation was published. In 1824–1829 he appears as "Teacher of Drawing and Perspective, and Lithographist to the University of Oxford", and worked for the University's Ashmolean Museum and scientific community. By October 1827 he had left Oxford, and the contents of his St Clement’s house were sold by auction. 

In 1830 and 1831 he was at 24 Garnault Place, Spa Fields, Islington, London. The 1841 census shows him living at 34 Richard Street in Islington with his young nephew Henry Hyde: both were described as engravers. In 1851 he was still at the same address with his wife Ann Whitlock, nee Hyde, his nephew and business partner Henry Hyde, and his niece Caroline Hyde.

Works
Whittock was "a prolific writer of instruction books", on drawing and other subjects, such as The decorative painters' and glaziers' guide (1828), On the construction and decoration of the shop fronts of London (1840), and The complete book of trades, or the parents' guide and youths' instructor (1837). The full title of the first of these was:

As the full title shows, the work was very comprehensive, and the preface "rails against trade secrecy" which the book was intended to dispel. The work has been described as "influential" and "important" and is often cited by modern scholars of interior decoration.

References

External links

Images of engravings, etc.
Whittock's picture of Robin Hood's Bay
 A picture of  engraved by Fenner for Fisher's Drawing Room Scrap Book, 1836 with a poetical illustration by Letitia Elizabeth Landon.
 A picture of  engraved by W J Cooke for Fisher's Drawing Room Scrap Book, 1836 with a poetical illustration by Letitia Elizabeth Landon.

List of publications
 List from British Library

1791 births
1860 deaths
Artists from London
19th-century engravers
British engravers